The 2005 European Pairs Speedway Championship was the second edition of the European Pairs Speedway Championship. The final was held in Gdańsk, Poland on 12 June. Poland won their first title.

Semifinal 1
  Slany
 May 7

Semifinal 2
  Krško
 May 8

event was canceled

Final
  Gdańsk
 June 12

See also
 2005 Individual Speedway European Championship

References 

2005
European P